INTAR Theatre, founded in 1966, is one of the oldest Hispanic theater companies in the United States.  The INTAR acronym is for International Arts Relations.

History
INTAR Theatre was founded in New York in 1966 as Asociación de Arte Latinoamericano (ADAL) by a group of Cuban and Puerto Rican writers and artists. Cuban-born Max Ferrá served as INTAR's artistic director since its founding until 2004, when Cuban-American playwright Eduardo Machado assumed artistic leadership of the organization.

In its early years, INTAR focused on producing in Spanish the works of significant European and American playwrights. In the 1970s, the organization began producing works in English by Ibero-American and Latino writers. The theater company has built on this strength and emphasizes in new works that reflect the cultural heritage and concerns of the Hispanic community in the United States. Works have included drama, musicals, children's theater, collaborative visual arts and theater creations, and traveling productions.

In 1977 it was of first eight theaters that replaced adult entertainment venues on 42nd Street to form Theatre Row.

INTAR has historically focused on four program areas. The theater program has resulted in over 125 theater productions by more than 175 playwrights and composers. The developmental theater program has hosted various writing labs and workshops designed to support the creation of new theater works by Hispanic artists. Almost every Latino playwright working today has participated in one of INTAR's workshops. Cuban-born, avant-garde playwright María Irene Fornés directed the Hispanic Playwrights-in-Residence Lab from 1981 to 1991. Graciela Daniele ran a Music Theater Lab from 1985 to 1989, and in 1991, INTAR hosted an Actors Lab.

The New Works Lab was founded in 1994 under the direction of Michael Garces and is designed to support the creative development of emerging directors, writers, actors and other artists from the Latino theater community. Most recently, INTAR launched the Actor's Collective as part of its developmental theater program.

Inverna Lockpez founded INTAR's Latin American Gallery in 1979, serving as curator through the 1990s. The Gallery was established as an alternative space to provide exposure for emerging and established Latino and Latin American artists, producing bilingual catalogs and posters for its exhibitions.

INTAR also operated an educational program for public school students, including field days bringing students and teachers to INTAR for matinee performances and guided tours; an internship program; and in-school touring productions.

Today, INTAR focuses on its theater and developmental theater programs.

Works or publications

See also 

 Latino Theater in the United States
 Latino Literature
 Puerto Rican literature
 Aguijon Theater
 Pregones
 Puerto Rican Traveling Theater

Notes and references

Further reading

External links
 The INTAR Theatre records are available at the Cuban Heritage Collection, University of Miami Libraries. INTAR Theatre Records include the organizational records of New York-based INTAR Theatre, one of the oldest Hispanic theater companies in the United States. The collection contains scripts, musical scores, correspondence, financial records, photographs, audiovisual materials, posters, programs, clippings, and other materials related to INTAR Theatre productions from its founding in 1966 to 2004. The collection also includes the records of INTAR's Latin American Gallery.
 Venue page for INTAR in the Cuban Theater Digital Archive

Theatre companies in New York City
Hispanic and Latino American culture in New York City